Barreira or Barreiras (Portuguese meaning "barrier" and "barriers", respectively) might refer to:

People 
Luís Barreira, a Portuguese mathematician

Places

Brazil 
Barreira, Ceará
Barreiras, Bahia
Barreiras Airport
Barreiras do Piauí, Piauí

Portugal 

 Barreiras, a village in Peral, Cadaval, Lisbon District

Other uses 

 Barreira do Inferno Launch Center, also referred to as Barreira do Inferno, a Brazilian rocket launch base
 Barreira Megalithic Complex, a Portuguese megalithic site